On 18 October 2019, a bombing occurred in a mosque in Haska Meyna District, Nangarhar province, Afghanistan, killing at least 73 worshippers. Dozens more were injured in the attack. No group has claimed responsibility.

Attack
A bomb exploded during Friday prayer at the mosque, located in the Jawdara village of Haska Meyna District. Hundreds were there to take part in the prayer when the bomb detonated killing 72 and injuring at least 36 other people. The blast caused the roof to collapse, leaving many bodies under the rubble. The New York Times reported that the blast was caused by a suicide bomber, who entered the mosque during men's prayer and detonated explosives.

Among the victims of the blast were 23 teenagers and children, along with the village's only doctor, Mohammed Aref, and several of his family members. Two teachers were also killed in the attack.

Responsibility
No group has claimed responsibility for the attack. The Taliban denied responsibility, instead claiming the explosions and collapse of the mosque were caused by a government mortar attack.

References

2019 murders in Afghanistan
21st century in Nangarhar Province
21st-century mass murder in Afghanistan
Mosque bombings in Asia
Attacks on religious buildings and structures in Afghanistan 
Crime in Nangarhar Province 
Improvised explosive device bombings in 2019
Improvised explosive device bombings in Afghanistan
Mass murder in 2019 
October 2019 crimes in Asia
October 2019 events in Afghanistan 
Terrorist incidents in Afghanistan in 2019
Building bombings in Afghanistan
Terrorist incidents by unknown perpetrators